Metacanthocephaloides is a genus of worms belonging to the family Rhadinorhynchidae.

Species
Species:
 Metacanthocephaloides zebrini Yamaguti, 1959

References

Rhadinorhynchidae
Acanthocephala genera